Rett syndrome (RTT) is a genetic disorder that typically becomes apparent after 6–18 months of age and almost exclusively in females. Symptoms include impairments in language and coordination, and repetitive movements. Those affected often have slower growth, difficulty walking, and a smaller head size. Complications of Rett syndrome can include seizures, scoliosis, and sleeping problems. The severity of the condition is variable.

Rett syndrome is due to a genetic mutation in the MECP2 gene, on the X chromosome. It almost always occurs as a new mutation, with less than one percent of cases being inherited. It occurs almost exclusively in girls; boys who have a similar mutation typically die shortly after birth. Diagnosis is based on the symptoms and can be confirmed with genetic testing.

There is no known cure for Rett syndrome. Treatment is directed at improving symptoms. Anticonvulsants may be used to help with seizures. Special education, physiotherapy, and leg braces may also be useful depending on the needs of the child. Many of those with the condition live into middle age.

The condition affects about 1 in 8,500 females.  In 1999, Lebanese-American physician Huda Zoghbi discovered the mutation that causes the condition.

Signs and symptoms

Stage I
Stage I, called early-onset, typically begins between 6 and 18 months of age. This stage is often overlooked because symptoms of the disorder may be somewhat vague, and parents and doctors may not notice the subtle slowing of development at first. The infant may begin to show less eye contact and have reduced interest in toys. There may be delays in gross motor skills such as sitting or crawling. Hand-wringing and decreasing head growth may occur, but not enough to draw attention. This stage usually lasts for a few months but can continue for more than a year.

Stage II
Stage II, or the rapid destructive stage, usually begins between ages 1 and 4 and may last for weeks or months. Its onset may be rapid or gradual as the child loses purposeful hand skills and spoken language. Characteristic hand movements such as wringing, washing, clapping, or tapping, as well as repeatedly moving the hands to the mouth often begin during this stage which is called mouthing. The child may hold the hands clasped behind the back or held at the sides, with random touching, grasping, and releasing. The movements continue while the child is awake but disappear during sleep. Breathing irregularities such as episodes of apnea and hyperventilation may occur, although breathing usually improves during sleep. Some girls also display autistic-like symptoms such as loss of social interaction and communication. Walking may be unsteady and initiating motor movements can be difficult. Slowed head growth is usually noticed during this stage.

Stage III
Stage III, or the plateau or pseudo-stationary stage, usually begins between ages 2 and 10 and can last for years. Apraxia, motor problems, and seizures are prominent during this stage. However, there may be improvement in behavior, with less irritability, crying, and autistic-like features. In stage III there may be more interest in the surroundings and alertness, attention span, and communication skills may improve. Many girls remain in this stage for most of their lives.

Stage IV
Stage IV, or the late motor deterioration stage, can last for years or decades. Prominent features include reduced mobility, curvature of the spine, and muscle weakness, rigidity, spasticity, and increased muscle tone with abnormal posturing of an arm or leg. Girls who were previously able to walk may stop walking. Cognition, communication, or hand skills generally do not decline in stage IV. Repetitive hand movements may decrease and eye gaze usually improves.

Variants
The signs and symptoms of the typical form of the Rett syndrome are well described.
In addition to the classical form of Rett syndrome, several atypical forms have been described over the years; the main groups are:
 Congenital variant (Rolando variant): in this severe subtype of Rett syndrome, the development of the patients and their head circumference are abnormal from birth. The typical gaze of Rett syndrome patients is usually absent;
 Zappella variant of Rett Syndrome or preserved speech variant: in this subtype of Rett syndrome the patients acquire some manual skills and language is partially recovered around the age of 5 years (that is after the regression phase). Height, weight and head circumference are often in the normal range, and a good gross motor function can be observed. The Zappella variant is a milder form of Rett syndrome;
 Hanefeld variant or early epilepsy variant. In this form of Rett syndrome, the patients have epilepsy before 5 months of age.
The definition itself of the Rett syndrome has been refined over the years: as the atypical forms subsist near to the classical form (Hagberg & Gillberg, 1993), the "Rett Complex" terminology has been introduced.

Cause
Genetically, Rett syndrome (RTT) is caused by mutations in the gene MECP2 located on the X chromosome (which is involved in transcriptional silencing and epigenetic regulation of methylated DNA), and can arise sporadically or from germline mutations. In less than 10% of RTT cases, mutations in the genes CDKL5 or FOXG1 have also been found to resemble it. Rett syndrome is initially diagnosed by clinical observation, but the diagnosis is definitive when there is a genetic defect in the MECP2 gene.

It has been argued that Rett syndrome is in fact a neurodevelopmental condition as opposed to a neurodegenerative condition. One piece of evidence for this is that mice with induced Rett Syndrome show no neuronal death, and some studies have suggested that their phenotypes can be partially rescued by adding functional MECP2 gene back when they are adults. This information has also helped lead to further studies aiming to treat the disorder.

Sporadic mutations

In at least 95% of Rett syndrome cases, the cause is a de novo mutation in the child. That is, it is not inherited from either parent. Parents are generally genotypically normal, without a MECP2 mutation.

In cases of the sporadic form of RTT, the mutated MECP2 is thought to derive almost exclusively from a de novo mutation on the male copy of the X chromosome. It is not yet known what causes the sperm to mutate, and such mutations are rare.

Germline mutations
It can also be inherited from phenotypically normal mothers who have a germline mutation in the gene encoding methyl-CpG-binding protein-2, MeCP2. In these cases, inheritance follows an X-linked dominant pattern and is seen almost exclusively in females, as most males die in utero or shortly after birth. MECP2 is found near the end of the long arm of the X chromosome at Xq28. An atypical form of RTT, characterized by infantile spasms or early onset epilepsy, can also be caused by a mutation to the gene encoding cyclin-dependent kinase-like 5 (CDKL5). As stated by Aine Merwick, Margaret O'Brien, and Norman Delanty in an article on gene disorders titled Complex single gene disorders and epilepsy, "Rett syndrome affects one in every 12,500 female live births by age 12 years."

Mechanism

Pontine noradrenergic deficits
Brain levels of norepinephrine are lower in people with Rett syndrome (reviewed in). The genetic loss of MECP2 changes the properties of cells in the locus coeruleus, the exclusive source of noradrenergic innervation to the cerebral cortex and hippocampus. These changes include hyperexcitability and decreased functioning of its noradrenergic innervation. Moreover, a reduction of the tyrosine hydroxylase (Th) mRNA level, the rate-limiting enzyme in catecholamine synthesis, was detected in the whole pons of MECP2-null male as well as in adult heterozygous (MECP2+/-) female mice. Using immunoquantitative techniques, a decrease of Th protein staining level, number of locus coeruleus Th-expressing neurons and density of dendritic arborization surrounding the structure was shown in symptomatic MeCP2-deficient mice. However, locus coeruleus cells are not dying, but are more likely losing their fully mature phenotype, since no apoptotic neurons in the pons were detected.

Researchers have concluded that "Because these neurons are a pivotal source of norepinephrine throughout the brainstem and forebrain and are involved in the regulation of diverse functions disrupted in Rett syndrome, such as respiration and cognition, we hypothesize that the locus coeruleus is a critical site at which loss of MECP2 results in CNS dysfunction." The restoration of normal locus coeruleus function may therefore be of potential therapeutic value in the treatment of Rett syndrome.

Midbrain dopaminergic disturbances
The majority of dopamine in the mammalian brain is synthesized by nuclei located in the mesencephalon. The substantia nigra pars compacta (SNpc), the ventral tegmental area (VTA) and the retrorubral field (RRF) contains dopaminergic neurons expressing tyrosine hydroxylase (Th, i.e. the rate-limiting enzyme in catecholamine synthesis).

The nigro-striatal pathway originates from SNpc and irradiate its principal rostral target, the Caudate-Putamen (CPu) through the median forebrain bundle (MFB). This connection is involved in the tight modulation of motor strategies computed by a cortico-basal ganglia- thalamo-cortical loop.

Indeed, based on the canonical anatomofunctional model of basal ganglia, nigrostriatal dopamine is able to modulate the motor loop by acting on dopaminergic receptors located on striatal GABAergic medium spiny neurons.

Dysregulation of the nigrostriatal pathway is causative from Parkinson disease (PD) in humans. Toxic and/or genetic ablation of SNpc neurons produces experimental parkinsonism in mice and primates. The common features of PD and PD animal models are motor impairments (hypotonia, bradykinesia, hypokinesia).

RTT pathology, in some aspects, overlaps the motor phenotype observed in PD patients. Several neuropathological studies on postmortem brain samples argued for an SNpc alteration evidenced by neuromelanin hypopigmentation, reduction in the structure area, and even controversial, signs of apoptosis. In parallel, an hypometabolism was underlined by a reduction of several catecholamines (dopamine, noradrenaline, adrenaline) and their principal metabolic by-products. Mouse models of RTT are available and the most studied are constitutively deleted Mecp2 mice developed by Adrian Bird or Katelyn McCormick laboratories.

In accordance with the motor spectrum of the RTT phenotype, Mecp2-null mice show motor abnormalities from postnatal day 30 that worsen until death. These models offer a crucial substrate to elucidate the molecular and neuroanatomical correlates of an MeCP2-deficiency. Recently (2008), it was shown that the conditional deletion of Mecp2 in catecholaminergic neurons (by crossing of Th-Cre mice with loxP-flanked Mecp2 ones) recapitulates a motor symptomatology, it was further documented that brain levels of Th in mice lacking MeCP2 in catecholaminergic neurons only are reduced, participating to the motor phenotype.

However, the most studied model for the evaluation of therapeutics is the Mecp2-null mouse (totally devoid of MeCP2). In this context, a reduction in the number and soma size of Th-expressing neurons is present from 5 weeks of age and is accompanied by a decrease of Th immunoreactivity in the caudate-putamen, the principal target of dopaminergic neurons arising from the SNpc. Moreover, a neurochemical analysis of dopaminergic contents in microdissected midbrain and striatal areas revealed a reduction of dopamine at five and nine weeks of age. It is noteworthy that later on (at nine weeks), the morphological parameters remain altered but not worsen, whereas the phenotype progresses and behavioral deficits are more severe. The amount of fully activated Th (Serine40-phosphorylated isoform) in neurons that remain in the SNpc is mildly affected at 5 weeks but severely impaired by 9 weeks. Finally, using a chronic and oral L-Dopa treatment on MeCP2-deficient mice authors reported an amelioration of some of the motor deficits previously identified. Altogether, these results argue for an alteration of the nigrostriatal dopaminergic pathway in MeCP2-deficient animals as a contributor of the neuromotor deficits.

There is an association of the disease with brain-derived neurotrophic factor (BDNF).

Molecular functions of MECP2 in Rett syndrome pathology
As reviewed by Sharifi and Yasui, MECP2 protein, encoded by the MECP2 gene binds to DNA with a high affinity for CpG methylated DNA sites and affects transcription. MECP2 can bind to 5mc (5-methylcytosine) and 5hmc (5-hydroxymethylcytosine) with similar affinity, and these dinucleotides account for the majority of MECP2 binding sites in the mammalian genome.  MECP2 is involved in higher order chromatin organization and appears necessary for compacting chromosomes.  MECP2 binding to DNA influences mRNA splicing events.  MECP2 also appears to function in DNA repair processes.  MECP2-/+ deficient female mice have elevated rates of cell death when exposed to DNA damaging agents and are prone to early senescence.

Interactive pathway map
An interactive pathway map of Rett syndrome has been published.

Diagnosis

Prior to the discovery of a genetic cause, Rett syndrome had been designated as a pervasive developmental disorder by the Diagnostic and Statistical Manual of Mental Disorders (DSM), together with the autism spectrum disorders. Some argued against this conclusive assignment because RTT resembles non-autistic disorders such as fragile X syndrome, tuberous sclerosis, or Down syndrome that also exhibit autistic features.
After research proved the molecular mechanism, in 2013 the DSM-5 removed the syndrome altogether from classification as a mental disorder.

Rett syndrome diagnosis involves close observation of the child's growth and development to observe any abnormalities in regards to developmental milestones. A diagnosis is considered when decreased head growth is observed. Conditions with similar symptoms must first be ruled out.

There is a certain criteria that must be met for the diagnosis. A blood test can rule in or rule out the presence of the MECP2 mutation, however, this mutation is present in other conditions as well.

For a classic diagnosis, all four criteria for ruling in a diagnosis must be met, as well as the two criteria for ruling out a diagnosis. Supportive criteria may also be present, but are not required for diagnosis. For an atypical or variant diagnosis, at least two of the four criteria for ruling in the diagnosis must be met, as well as five of the eleven supportive criteria. A period of symptom regression followed by recovery or symptom stabilization must also occur. Children are often misdiagnosed as having autism, cerebral palsy, or another form of developmental delay. A positive test for the MECP2 mutation is not enough to make a diagnosis.

Ruling in
 Decreased or loss of use of fine motor skills
 Decreased or loss of verbal speech
 Abnormalities during gait
 Repetitive hand movements such as wringing/squeezing or clapping/tapping
Ruling out
 Traumatic or anoxic/hypoxic brain injury, neurometabolic disease, or severe infection that may better explain symptoms
 Abnormal psychomotor development during the first six months of life

Supportive criteria
 Breathing disturbances when awake
 Bruxism while awake
 Impaired sleep pattern
 Abnormal muscle tone
 Peripheral vasomotor disturbances
 Scoliosis/kyphosis
 Growth retardation
 Small cold hands and feet
 Inappropriate laughing/screaming spells
 Diminished response to pain
 Intense eye communication (eye pointing)

Differential diagnosis

Signs of Rett syndrome that are similar to autism:

Signs of Rett syndrome that are also present in cerebral palsy (regression of the type seen in Rett syndrome would be unusual in cerebral palsy; this confusion could rarely be made):

Treatment

Currently there is no cure for Rett syndrome. Treatment is directed towards improving function and addressing symptoms. A multi-disciplinary team approach is typically used to treat the person throughout life. This team may include a primary care physician, physical therapist, occupational therapist, speech-language pathologist, nutritionist, and support services in academic and occupational settings. Some children may require special equipment and aids such as braces to arrest scoliosis, splints to modify hand movements, and nutritional programs to help them maintain adequate weight.

Because of the increased risk of sudden cardiac death, when long QT syndrome is found on an annual screening EKG it is treated with an anti-arrhythmic such as a beta-blocker. There is some evidence that phenytoin may be more effective than a beta-blocker.

While medicinal interventions to mitigate breathing challenges in children with Rett Syndrome (RTT) are still being developed, children with RTT may be prescribed rebreathing techniques (e.g., rebreathing masks), oxygen delivery, or non-invasive ventilation as preventative or rescue breathing treatments. High oxidative stress levels in individuals with RTT have exacerbated effects on their cardiorespiratory health and functionality, dramatically increasing the risk for sudden cardiac death—an anomaly that has an associated 300x increased occurrence risk in children with Rett Syndrome. Due to this, it is vital to closely monitor atypical breathing behaviors in children with RTT, making sure to effectively use lifesaving respiratory improvement devices and strategies as prescribed.  

Prescribed treatment methods may vary depending on the breathing characteristic phenotype expressed by the child. Physicians have identified three major RTT breathing phenotypes; forceful breathers, feeble breathers, and apneustic breathers. For forceful breathers, for example, rebreathing masks may be used while the child is awake.

In Dec 2021, Australian company Neuren Pharmaceuticals reported positive results in a phase 3 trial of trofinetide for the treatment of Rett syndrome.  In Sep 2022, the FDA accepted a new drug application for trofinetide and granted it priority review.  In March 2023 the drug received FDA approval for treatment of Rett Syndrome.

Prognosis

Males with pathogenic MECP2 mutations usually die within the first 2 years from severe encephalopathy, unless they have one or more extra X chromosomes, or have somatic mosaicism.

Male fetuses with the disorder rarely survive to term. Because the disease-causing gene is located on the X chromosome, a female born with an MECP2 mutation on her X chromosome has another X chromosome with an ostensibly normal copy of the same gene, while a male with the mutation on his X chromosome has no other X chromosome, only a Y chromosome; thus, he has no normal gene. Without a normal gene to provide normal proteins in addition to the abnormal proteins caused by a MECP2 mutation, the XY karyotype male fetus is unable to slow the development of the disease, hence the failure of many male fetuses with a MECP2 mutation to survive to term.

Females with a MECP2 mutation, however, have a non-mutant chromosome that provides them enough normal protein to survive longer. Research shows that males with Rett syndrome may result from Klinefelter's syndrome, in which the male has an XXY karyotype. Thus, a non-mutant MECP2 gene is necessary for a Rett's-affected embryo to survive in most cases, and the embryo, male or female, must have another X chromosome.

There have, however, been several cases of 46,XY karyotype males with a MECP2 mutation (associated with classical Rett syndrome in females) carried to term, who were affected by neonatal encephalopathy and died before 2 years of age. The incidence of Rett syndrome in males is unknown, partly owing to the low survival of male fetuses with the Rett syndrome-associated MECP2 mutations, and partly to differences between signs caused by MECP2 mutations and those caused by Rett's.

Females can live up to 40 years or more. Laboratory studies on Rett syndrome may show abnormalities such as:
 EEG abnormalities from 2 years of age
 atypical brain glycolipids
 elevated CSF levels of beta-endorphin and glutamate
 reduction of substance P
 decreased levels of CSF nerve growth factors

A high proportion of deaths are abrupt, but most have no identifiable cause; in some instances death is the result most likely of:
 spontaneous brainstem dysfunction
 cardiac arrest, likely due to long QT syndrome, ventricular tachycardia or other arrhythmias
 seizures
 gastric perforation

History
Andreas Rett, a pediatrician in Vienna Austria, first described the condition in 1966. As his writings were in German, they did not become widely known in the English-speaking world. Bengt Hagberg, a Swedish pediatrician, published an English article in 1983 and named the condition after Rett. In 1999, Lebanese-American physician Huda Zoghbi discovered the mutation that causes the condition.

There are organizations that support this syndrome's awareness campaigns and fundraise to support treatment and research. For instance, the Noemie association hosts football competitions for young girls with Rett syndrome. Thierry Breton, an osteopath at the Parisis clinic, is the organizer of this event, which takes place in Cormeilles-en-Paris.
Twelve teams will compete in this event. This particular moment has already occurred countless times. It is a soccer competition in support of the group La vie selon Noémi. Shirts from professional footballers Zlatan Ibrahimovic, Adrien Rabiot, Gianelli Imbula, Axel Ngando, and Karl Toko-Ekambi will be among the prizes given away. Two to three children with the syndrome will receive some of the treatment they need in a specialized facility in Barcelona thanks to the money contributed (Spain). This is the story of Noémie, who was born at the hospital in Cormeilles, Paris. The girl's parents founded this organization to aid her and other kids with multiple disabilities and to spread awareness of this condition.

Research
Gene therapy is under study in animal models to achieve regulated expression of a normal MECP2 gene. In March 2022, Taysha Gene Therapies announced that they had received Clinical Trial Application (CTA) approval from Health Canada for a clinical trial of their investigational gene therapy for adult females with Rett Syndrome.

In fiction
In August 2021, a novel by British author Victoria Scott, Patience, was published by Head of Zeus. The novel featured a character with Rett syndrome and explored recent developments in gene therapy.

References

External links 

Communication disorders
Disorders causing seizures
Learning disabilities
Neurological disorders in children
Pervasive developmental disorders
Syndromes affecting the nervous system
Wikipedia medicine articles ready to translate
X-linked dominant disorders